Dhanraj Mahal is the residence of the princely Dhanrajgir family in Mumbai, India. 

It was the residence of the actress Zubeida Begum Dhanrajgir.

Architecture 
The building's architectural style is art deco.

References

Royal residences in Mumbai